St. Joseph's Cathedral, also Puerto Cabello Cathedral, is a Catholic cathedral located in the town of Puerto Cabello, Carabobo state, in northern Venezuela.

It is the seat of the Diocese of Puerto Cabello (Dioecesis Portus Cabellensis), created on July 5, 1994, by the bull Sollicitus de spirituali of Pope John Paul II. It is under the pastoral care of Bishop Saul Figueroa Albornoz.

Its history dates back to 1851, when the National Congress granted some land for its construction, which was completed in 1852. Subsequently, it underwent numerous modifications and even became temporarily used as a prison in the Liberation War.

See also
Roman Catholicism in Venezuela
St. Joseph's Cathedral (disambiguation)

References

Roman Catholic cathedrals in Venezuela
Puerto Cabello
Roman Catholic churches completed in 1852
Religious organizations established in 1852
1852 establishments in Venezuela
19th-century Roman Catholic church buildings in Venezuela